Thyretes is a genus of moths in the family Erebidae.

Species
 Thyretes buettikeri Wiltshire, 1983
 Thyretes caffra Wallengren, 1863
 Thyretes cooremani Kiriakoff, 1953
 Thyretes hippotes Cramer, 1780
 Thyretes montana Boisduval, 1847
 Thyretes monteiroi Butler, 1876
 Thyretes negus Oberthür, 1878
 Thyretes signivenis Hering, 1937
 Thyretes trichaetiformis Zerny, 1912
 Thyretes ustjuzhanini Dubatolov, 2012

References

Natural History Museum Lepidoptera generic names catalog

Syntomini
Moth genera